The 2011–12 LSU Tigers men's basketball team represented Louisiana State University in the sport of basketball during the 2011–12 college basketball season. The Tigers competed in Division I of the National Collegiate Athletic Association (NCAA) and Southeastern Conference (SEC). They were led by head coach Trent Johnson, and played their home games at the Pete Maravich Assembly Center on the university's Baton Rouge, Louisiana campus.

Previous season
The Tigers finished the 2010–11 season 11–21 overall, 3–13 in SEC play and lost in the first round of the SEC tournament to Vanderbilt.

Roster

Schedule

|-
!colspan=9| Regular season

|-
!colspan=9| SEC Regular Season

|-
!colspan=9| 2012 SEC tournament

|-
!colspan=9| 2012 NIT

References

LSU Tigers basketball seasons
Lsu
Lsu
LSU
LSU